Niels Wubben (born ) is a Dutch former professional cyclo-cross cyclist. He represented his nation in the men's elite event at the 2016 UCI Cyclo-cross World Championships  in Heusden-Zolder.

Major results

Cyclo-cross
2011–2012
 3rd National Championships

References

External links
 

1988 births
Living people
Cyclo-cross cyclists
Dutch male cyclists
People from Naaldwijk
Cyclists from South Holland
20th-century Dutch people
21st-century Dutch people